is a Japanese footballer who plays for Avispa Fukuoka.

Club statistics
Updated to 21 July 2022.

References

External links
Profile at Ventforet Kofu

Profile at Kashiwa Reysol

1993 births
Living people
Ryutsu Keizai University alumni
Association football people from Ibaraki Prefecture
Japanese footballers
J1 League players
Kashiwa Reysol players
J2 League players
Kyoto Sanga FC players
Ventforet Kofu players
Avispa Fukuoka players
Association football defenders
Universiade bronze medalists for Japan
Universiade medalists in football